Pesantren, or pondok pesantren, are Islamic boarding schools in Indonesia. They consist of pondok, mosque, santri, teaching of classical Islamic texts and Kyai. According to one popular tradition, the pesantren education system originated from traditional Javanese pondokan; dormitories; ashram for Hindu or viharas for Buddhists to learn religious philosophies, martial arts and meditation. Institutions much like them are found across the Islamic world and are called pondok in Malaysia and Southern Thailand and madrasa Islamia (Islamic madrasa) in India and Pakistan and much of the Arabic-speaking world. The pesantren aim is to deepen knowledge of the Qurʾān, particularly through the study of Arabic, traditions of exegesis, the Sayings of the Prophet, law and logic. The term pesantren derives from the root word santri or student -- pe-santri-an or the place of the santri.

As social institutions, pesantren have played a major role over the centuries. They emphasise core values of sincerity, simplicity, individual autonomy, solidarity and self-control. Young men and women are separated from their families, which contributes to a sense of individual commitment to the faith and close bonding to a teacher.

Description
Most pesantren provide housing or dormitory living at low or no cost for the students (Santri). The two type of educations systems are conducted throughout the day. Students in pesantren have almost 20 hours activities starting from early morning prayer starting at 4 am to midnight where they ended the evening with a study group in the dormitory. During the day, students attend formal school, which became mandatory until secondary school by 2005, like any other students outside the pesantren, and in the late afternoon and the evening, students must attend religious rituals, followed by religious studies and group studies to complete their homework.

Pesantren are provided to Indonesian citizens at low cost; although today some modern pesantren charge higher fees than previously, they are still significantly cheaper than non-pesantren educational institutions. The traditional pattern was for students to work in the headmaster's rice fields in exchange for food, shelter, and education.

All pesantren are led by a group of teachers and religious leaders known as Kyai. The Kyai is respected as teacher and devout man. Kyai also play important roles in the community as a religious leader and in recent years as a political figure. There are Kyai families that have a long history of serving in this role. Some contemporary Kyai are the grandsons and great-grandsons of famous historical figures who established well known pesantren.

Starting in the second half of the twentieth century, some pesantren started adding secular subjects to their curriculum as a way of negotiating modernity. The addition of state recognized curricula has affected traditional pesantren in a number of ways. It has led to greater control by the national government. It has also restricted the number of hours available for the traditional subjects making for difficult decisions. Many pesantren leaders have decided that the training of religious leaders is not their sole purpose and are now satisfied to graduate young men and women who have the morality of Kyai. The reduction of hours available to now master two curricula has led to practical changes. While it is still possible for the children of the poor to work in the Kyai's economic ventures (more than just rice fields these days), most parents will pay both room and board and small tuition. The time that used to be spent working, is now spent in secular education.

Pesantren curriculum has four possible components: 
 traditional religious education, called ngaji; 
 government recognized curricula (there are two different types to choose from); 
 vocational skills training; 
 character development.

Pesantren differ to the degree that they engage each of these components; however, all feel that character development for the students is the defining characteristic of any pesantren.

Through curricular redesign pesantren people engage in a process of (re)imagining modernity. Modernity must be first imagined as potentially dangerous in terms of the morals that often accompany it. It must then be imagined as redeemable, that it can be detached from one set of "problematic" morals and reattached to Islamic morality.

One prominent pesantren figure in Indonesia is Abdurrahman Wahid (Gus Dur), a former President of Indonesia. He was well educated in pesantren during his youth and grown up as a grandson of a Kyai, the founder of one of Indonesian religious political organizations, Nahdlatul Ulama. Gus Dur himself was the head of this organization from 1984 until 1999. After his term as President of Indonesia, Gus Dur returned to teaching in his pesantren in Ciganjur.

See also

 Islam in Indonesia
 Madrasa
 Surau
 Kyai, honorific title for leaders of pesantren
 List of Islamic seminaries
 Kitab kuning
 Kota santri

Notes

 
 
Schools in Indonesia
Islamic schools
Boarding schools in Indonesia
Islamic terminology